Ye Ruyi (born 26 May 1987) is a Chinese wheelchair fencer. He represented China at the Summer Paralympics in 2008, 2012 and 2016 and in total he won six gold medals at the Summer Paralympics.

References

External links 

 

Living people
1987 births
Place of birth missing (living people)
Chinese male foil fencers
Wheelchair fencers at the 2008 Summer Paralympics
Wheelchair fencers at the 2012 Summer Paralympics
Wheelchair fencers at the 2016 Summer Paralympics
Medalists at the 2008 Summer Paralympics
Medalists at the 2012 Summer Paralympics
Medalists at the 2016 Summer Paralympics
Paralympic gold medalists for China
Paralympic medalists in wheelchair fencing
Paralympic wheelchair fencers of China
Chinese male sabre fencers
21st-century Chinese people